Triggernometry is the fifth album from hardcore rap group Onyx, released on July 22, 2003, by D3 Entertainment. The whole album was produced by Kronic Tones. The album features appearances by American rappers T Hussle, Genovese, Begetz, X1, Bad Luck, Dirty Getinz. The album peaked at No. 66 on the Top R&B/Hip-Hop Albums music chart.

Background 
Triggernometry is an album consisting of 10 new tracks and 11 stories from the life of the group Onyx, told by the group members themselves in the gap between the songs. All the songs were produced by one producer Kronic Tones, who had already produced 7 tracks for Fredro Starr's second solo album Don't Get Mad Get Money. The album was criticized by the fans of the group Onyx, who believe that such production is suitable only for nightclubs, but not for the streets. Originally, the album was due out on October 31 under the title Triggernometry: The Study of Guns, but later the name was shortened to Triggernometry, and the album was released earlier.

Singles 
The one and only single, "Mama Cryin'/Wild N Here" featuring X1, Begetz, Dirty Getinz, Bad Luck was released in 2003.

Critical response

In 2003, the editor of the Russian online newspaper NewsLab.ru, Mitya Meshalkin, praised the album, adding that Triggernometry, despite the frightening (a mixture of the words "trigger" and "trigonometry") name, had noticeably less street negligence and noticeably more "musicality".

In 2003, RapReviews.com editor Steve "Flash" Juon gave the album a 4 out of 10, calling it "pathetic attempt to relive past Onyx glories". The author also noted that Sticky exhibits the same problem he did on "Decade," namely that he sounds tired and unenthused, like he's going through the motions. Sticky and Fredro seem equally uninterested in resurrecting the name Onyx and shouldn't have even tried.

Track listing

Samples
Gun Clap Music
"Calypso Rock" by Original Tropicana Steel Band

O.N.Y.X. (Unreleased Original Version)
"You're a Big Girl Now" by The Stylistics (1970)

Leftover tracks 
Songs that were recorded in 2002-2003 during the "Triggernometry" sessions but cut from the final album:
 "Gun Clap Music" (Original)
 "Wild In Here" (Demo Version)
 "O.N.Y.X."
 "Over (feat. Begetz)" (Demo Version)

Personnel
Credits for Triggernometry adapted from AllMusic and CD booklet.

 Onyx - performer, vocals
 Fredro Starr - performer, vocals, executive producer
 Sticky Fingaz - performer, vocals, executive producer
 Sonny Seeza - performer, vocals
 Omar "Iceman" Sharif — executive producer
 T Hussle — guest artist
 Genovese — guest artist
 Begetz — guest artist
 X1 — guest artist
 Bad Luck — guest artist
 Dirty Getinz — guest artist
 Kronic Tones — producer
 Dominche — co-producer
 Hector Delgado — recording, mixing, co-producer
 Brian Porizek — artwork, design
 Aldy Damian — label direction

Charts

References

External links 
 Triggernometry at Discogs
 Triggernometry at RapGenius
 "Mama Cryin'/Wild N Here" at Discogs

Onyx (group) albums
2003 albums